Will McDonald IV (born June 4, 1999) is an American football defensive end for the Iowa State Cyclones.

Early life and high school
McDonald grew up in Pewaukee, Wisconsin, and initially attended Casimir Pulaski High School. He transferred to Waukesha North High School in Waukesha, Wisconsin, after his freshman year, where he lettered in baseball, basketball, and track and field at Waukesha North.

College career
McDonald had three tackles with one sack and a forced fumble in four games as a true freshman before deciding to redshirt the rest of the season. McDonald was named first team All-Big 12 Conference as a redshirt sophomore after setting a school record and tying for the national lead with 10.5 sacks. McDonald broke his previous single-season sack record and the Iowa State career sacks record during his redshirt junior season.

References

External links
 Iowa State Cyclones bio

1999 births
Living people
American football defensive ends
Players of American football from Wisconsin
Iowa State Cyclones football players
All-American college football players